The Mentakab–Temerloh Bypass, Federal Route 2 is a main highway bypass in Pahang, Malaysia.

History

In 1971, the old Temerloh Bridge spanning across the Pahang River was collapsed due to the huge flood in Temerloh. As a result, the Malaysian Public Works Department (JKR) constructed a 575-m replacement bridge known as the Sultan Ahmad Shah Bridge FT2 beside the old bridge. The Sultan Ahmad Shah Bridge was much higher than the old bridge, forming the first grade-separated interchange in Pahang that was linked to the Federal Route 10. The new bridge project also included a new roadway that bypassed Temerloh and Mentakab, causing the former Temerloh-Mentakab section to be re-gazetted as the Federal Route 87. The construction of the Sultan Ahmad Shah Bridge was completed in 1974.

List of junctions and towns

References

Highways in Malaysia